Guy Patrick O'Connell (born 11 March 1966 in Guildford, Surrey) is an English television and radio presenter, working mainly for the BBC. He presents BBC Radio 4's Broadcasting House programme each Sunday morning. He is also an occasional presenter of Radio 4's PM programme. O'Connell is a Fellow of the Royal Society of Arts.

Education
Paddy O'Connell was educated at Gresham's School and the University of Aberdeen.

Career
O'Connell began his broadcasting career in 1989 on the BBC's local radio trainee scheme, leading to five years spent as a BBC local radio reporter in Devon, Essex and Cleveland. He then joined BBC Radio 5 Live at its launch in 1994, before moving to the United States to present BBC World Service's programme The World. He has also presented and reported for a range of other radio stations across the world, including in Australia and Canada.

In 1997 O'Connell became BBC News's North America Business Correspondent and Wall Street anchor, based in New York City. He appeared regularly on BBC World, BBC News 24 and BBC One news bulletins, reporting on and presenting business news. Alongside Richard Quest, he was the U.S.-based anchor for the BBC's programme World Business Report on BBC World and BBC News 24, on which he became well-known for his relaxed but incisive style, and his deadpan delivery.

O'Connell was in New York City at the time of the September 11, 2001 attacks, and was due to attend a meeting inside the World Trade Center on that day. He reported from the scene of the attacks just hours later, interviewing survivors in the aftermath, and anchored the BBC's coverage from the scene that evening.

He stayed in New York for a further two years but left the United States, and the BBC, in 2003. He then did a variety of freelance work, including a wide range of work for the BBC. He fronted a wide range of news and entertainment shows on the corporation's youth-orientated digital channel BBC Three. He presented Celebdaq, a show based around a celebrity stock exchange, allowing O'Connell to mix his vast business knowledge with his interest in showbusiness. He also worked on Liquid News, replacing the late Christopher Price as its main presenter; presented the one-off Flashmob – The Opera; and was a main anchor on the offbeat current affairs show BBC Three News.

O'Connell was one of the main presenters on the daily BBC Two business news programme Working Lunch, and anchored the show every Friday and occasionally at other times, presenting alongside Adam Shaw or Nik Wood. He joined the programme in 2003 and produced a number of special reports alongside his presentation duties. He left the programme on 26 September 2008, ahead of its relaunch with new presenters. He also appeared regularly on BBC Breakfast, presenting the programme's business news segments from the London Stock Exchange, filling in for regular business reporter Declan Curry.

He presented the weekday evening TV quiz show Battle of the Brains on BBC Two, before being replaced by Nicky Campbell.

Alongside these BBC commitments, O'Connell was also a regular presenter on the London radio station LBC 97.3.

Current TV and radio work
O'Connell currently works on a wide range of BBC radio and TV programmes. He presents the weekly BBC Radio 4 Sunday morning news programme, Broadcasting House. He joined the programme full-time in 2006, having previously covered for its former presenter Fi Glover while she was on maternity leave.

On an episode of Broadcasting House in March 2013 O'Connell was so moved by the journalist Emilie Blachère's reading of her poem "A Love Letter from Emilie Blachère to Rémi Ochlik" that was unable to continue and the programme fell silent for around twelve seconds. Blachère read her poem on the first anniversary of th death of the photojournalist Rémi Ochlik, her partner, who died with the veteran war correspondent Marie Colvin during the Syrian Civil War in 2012. 

O'Connell is also an occasional presenter of PM on BBC Radio 4, standing in for its regular host, Evan Davis, and he also often stands in for Jeremy Vine on his BBC Radio 2 lunchtime news and current affairs programme.

In addition to news programmes, he also regularly sits in for a wide array of presenters on Radio 2, including Zoe Ball, Vanessa Feltz and Paul O'Grady.

He also previously worked as a regular reporter on BBC One's evening current affairs programme The One Show, and has occasionally presented South East Today.

O'Connell continues to dabble in both light and prime-time entertainment programmes. From 2004 he commentated on the Eurovision Song Contest semi-finals on BBC Three. He also presented various behind-the-scenes segments at the main final of the contest, shown on BBC Three. In 2010 O'Connell took part in a Eurovision edition of PopMaster on  the Ken Bruce Show on BBC Radio 2, losing to John Kennedy O'Connor. He was again a contestant on 17 May 2013, winning the contest against Ken Bruce, with John Kennedy O'Connor as question master. On 17 March 2011 he announced via Twitter that he had been replaced as a commentator for the Eurovision semi-finals as the BBC "refreshed" its Eurovision team. He appeared in the 2011 documentary The Secret History of Eurovision. In 2017 he appeared alongside Ken Bruce on Radio Two's coverage of the Eurovision Song Contest final and in recent years he has often been heard in conversation with Ken Bruce during Radio Two's Eurovision Song Contest coverage.

In 2016 he presented a series on BBC Radio 4, Travels with Bob, in which he visited various places in Britain with his border terrier.

He also regularly chairs the First Wednesday discussions hosted by the Frontline Club in West London, in which experts and key figures debate current geopolitical events happening around the world.

Personal life
O'Connell is gay and is an ambassador for the charity Stonewall.

References

External links

Agent's webpage
Working Lunch profile
Broadcasting House website
Media Guardian interview – Paddy O'Connell

People from Guildford
BBC newsreaders and journalists
BBC World News
BBC World Service people
English television presenters
Living people
People educated at Gresham's School
1966 births
English LGBT broadcasters
English LGBT journalists
English gay men
Gay journalists